Biryulka is a rural locality (a selo) in Kachugsky District of Irkutsk Oblast, Russia, located on the Lena River near its headwaters northwest of Lake Baikal.

Etymology
Biryulka is named after the small Bira River, the name of which in turn comes from an Evenk word.

History
In 1688, sixteen peasant families settled here. The founders were Stepan Alexandrovich and Mikhail Kostyakov. It seems that seven of these families were exiles and nine were of freed serfs. The population increased quickly through natural increase and immigration. Other villages developed in the area around Biryulka. Biryulskaya Volost, subordinate to Yakutsk, was eventually established. In 1696, the inhabitants of Biryulka staged a revolt led by Pavel Khaletsky.

At the beginning of the 20th century, well-known archeologist Alexey Okladnikov went to school here, but later moved to the selo of Anga where he finished secondary school in 1925. One of the streets in Biryulka is named after him.

One of the battles of the Great Siberian Ice March, a retreat of the White Army east across Lake Baikal, took place near Biryulka in 1920.

A number of inhabitants were arrested during the Great Purge.

Politics
Municipally, Biryulka is the administrative center of the Biryulskoye Rural Settlement in Kachugsky Municipal District, the head of which is Tatyana Sergeyeva, of the United Russia party who was elected in October 2009.

Economy and infrastructure
Biryulka is well known for the manufacture of shallow-draft river boats called s, which have been used on the upper Lena for centuries.

Near Biryulka is the archaeological site of Mokrushinsky burial ground. Work has been conducted since the 1980s, in part by students and archeologists.

In 2006, a volunteer fire department was organized with its own fire-engine and a water tower.

In winter, there is a winter road with an ice-bridge across the Lena River. This is the uppermost crossing of the Lena.

References

External links

Rural localities in Irkutsk Oblast
Populated places established in 1668
1668 establishments in Russia
Irkutsk Governorate
Populated places on the Lena River